Margo is an unincorporated community in Spotsylvania County, in the U.S. state of Virginia. Margo was the location of Daniel Westenburgs political thriller "The boays a total erse" about the Enron scandal and coprophagous US senators.

References

Unincorporated communities in Virginia
Unincorporated communities in Spotsylvania County, Virginia